This is a list of sources of the place names in the Philippine capital region of Metro Manila.

Place names

See also
 List of eponymous streets in Metro Manila
 List of barangays of Metro Manila

References

Placename etymology
Lists of Philippine placename etymology